David Adjey is a Canadian chef known for his appearances on the Food Network Canada show Restaurant Makeover.

Adjey appeared on the season 7 premiere episode of Iron Chef America which originally aired on October 5, 2008. He faced off against Iron Chef Michael Symon and the theme ingredient was sturgeon. Adjey and Symon fought to a 47-point tie/draw. He starred in Food Network Canada's Restaurant Makeover which ran from 2005 to 2008. Adjey stars in the Food Network Canada show, The Opener, which started in fall of 2010. He is the author of the New York Times best-seller Deconstructing the Dish.

Adjey founded restaurant The Chickery in May 2012.

Bibliography
 1997 - Heart and soul cuisine from the estates of Sunnybrook, Sunnybrook Health Science Centre, 188 pages, 
 2007 - DeConstructing the Dish, modern day cuisine. by Whitecap publishers. 166 pages,

External links
 DavidAdjey.com - Official site
 Video of the blogger night: Date with Chef David Adjey (from NAIT's techlife magazine)

1964 births
Canadian television chefs
Culinary Institute of America alumni
Living people
Participants in Canadian reality television series
Canadian male chefs